Mukhran Gogia (born August 16, 1971 in Zugdidi, Samegrelo-Zemo Svaneti) is a retired male weightlifter from Georgia. He qualified for the 1996 Summer Olympics, but eventually did not start in Atlanta, Georgia. Four years later Gogia had to retire after one snatch after having finished fourth in the men's heavyweight division (– 105 kg) at the 1999 World Weightlifting Championships. Gogia now is a truck driver for Zen Auto Transport LLC out of Southampton, PA.

References

External links 
 

1971 births
Living people
Male weightlifters from Georgia (country)
Olympic weightlifters of Georgia (country)
Weightlifters at the 1996 Summer Olympics
Weightlifters at the 2000 Summer Olympics